The 1990 U.S. Figure Skating Championships took place in Salt Lake City, Utah. Medals were awarded in four colors: gold (first), silver (second), bronze (third), and pewter (fourth) in four disciplines – men's singles, ladies' singles, pair skating, and ice dancing – across three levels: senior, junior, and novice.

The event determined the U.S. teams for the 1990 World Championships.

Senior results

Men

Ladies

Pairs

Ice dancing

Junior results

Men

Ladies

Pairs

Ice dancing
(incomplete standings)

References

U.S. Figure Skating Championships
United States Figure Skating Championships, 1990
United States Figure Skating Championships, 1990
U.S. Figure Skating
February 1990 sports events in the United States